(born 6 September 1974 in the Yamanashi Prefecture) is a Japanese former rugby union player who played as lock.

Career
Hayano started to play rugby union in 1993 for Teikyo University rugby union team until 1996, when he graduated. A year later, he joined Suntory Sungoliath, where played until 2010, when he retired. He was Suntory's captain in the Top League inaugural season in 200 3. He was also called up by the then-national coach Shogo Mukai for the Japan squad for the 2003 Rugby World Cup, although he did not play any match in the tournament. He also played for Japan A and for the Kanto representative team.

References

External links
2019 ALL FOR JAPAN TEAM
ジャパンラグビートップリーグ 選手情報

1974 births
Teikyo University alumni
Japanese rugby union players
Sportspeople from Yamanashi Prefecture
Tokyo Sungoliath players
Japan international rugby union players
Rugby union locks
Living people